opened as the  in Hirara, Okinawa Prefecture, Japan in 1989. Upon the merger of Hirara into Miyakojima in 2005, the museum reopened as the Miyakojima City Museum. It is dedicated to the area's natural history, history, folkways, and culture.

See also
 Okinawa Prefectural Museum
 List of Important Intangible Folk Cultural Properties
 List of Cultural Properties of Japan - historical materials (Okinawa)
 List of Natural Monuments of Japan (Okinawa)

References

External links
  Miyakojima City Museum

Miyakojima, Okinawa
Museums in Okinawa Prefecture
Museums established in 1989
1989 establishments in Japan